Joseph Arsine Paul Emile Albert "Babe" Bibeault (April 12, 1919 – August 2, 1970) was a Canadian ice hockey goaltender. He played in the NHL from 1941 to 1947.

Playing career
Born in Montreal, Quebec, Bibeault started his National Hockey League career in 1940 with the Montreal Canadiens.  He would also play for the Chicago Black Hawks, Toronto Maple Leafs and Boston Bruins. He was a member of the NHL All-Star team in 1944.

Career statistics

Regular season and playoffs

External links
 

1919 births
1970 deaths
Boston Bruins players
Buffalo Bisons (AHL) players
Canadian expatriate ice hockey players in the United States
Canadian ice hockey goaltenders
Chicago Blackhawks players
Cincinnati Mohawks (AHL) players
Cincinnati Mohawks (IHL) players
Dallas Texans (USHL) players
Fort Worth Rangers players
Ice hockey people from Montreal
Montreal Canadiens players
Toronto Maple Leafs players
Washington Lions players